435th may refer to:

435th Air Ground Operations Wing, the first USAFE wing solely dedicated to supporting battlefield Airmen
435th Bombardment Squadron, an inactive United States Air Force unit
435th Fighter Training Squadron (435 FTS), part of the 12th Flying Training Wing based at Randolph Air Force Base, Texas
435th Operations Group, an inactive United States Air Force unit
435th Security Forces Squadron (435th SFS), a United States Air Force unit capable of overland airlift, air assault, or airborne insertion into crisis situations

See also
435 (number)
435, the year 435 (CDXXXV) of the Julian calendar
435 BC